Adam Clarke (born 10 November 1981) is an English cricketer. He played three first-class matches for Cambridge University Cricket Club between 2001 and 2004.

See also
 List of Cambridge University Cricket Club players

References

External links
 

1981 births
Living people
English cricketers
Cambridge University cricketers
People from Sherwood, Nottingham
Cricketers from Nottinghamshire
Cambridge MCCU cricketers